Thomas James Chesshyre Tomlin, Baron Tomlin, PC (6 May 1867 – 13 August 1935) was a British barrister and judge.

Early life and career 
Born in Canterbury, Kent, the son of a barrister, Tomlin was educated at Harrow School and New College, Oxford, where he obtained a first-class degree in Jurisprudence and second-class honours in the BCL. He was called to the bar by the Middle Temple (1891) and ad eundem by Lincoln's Inn (1892). He was the pupil, then the devil, of Robert Parker, until the latter was appointed to the High Court in 1906; Tomlin, whose practice had until then been a moderate one, inherited most of Parker's practice.

He was Junior Equity Counsel to the Board of Inland Revenue, the Board of Trade, the Commissioners of Woods and Forests, the Charity Commissioners, and the Board of Education. He took silk in 1913 and was elected a bencher of Lincoln's Inn in 1928

Judicial career 
In 1923, Tomlin was appointed as a judge to the Chancery Division of the High Court and received the customary knighthood. As a Chancery judge, he was responsible for the creation of the eponymous Tomlin order.

On 11 February 1929, he was appointed Lord of Appeal in Ordinary (without first serving on the Court of Appeal) and was created a life peer with the title Baron Tomlin, of Ash in the County of Kent, and was sworn into the Privy Council.

As Lord of Appeal in Ordinary, he is perhaps best remembered for his leading judgment in the Duke of Westminster's case concerning tax avoidance, in which he said:Every man is entitled if he can to order his affairs so that the tax attaching under the appropriate Acts is less than it otherwise would be. If he succeeds in ordering them so as to secure this result, then, however unappreciative the Commissioners of Inland Revenue or his fellow tax-payers may be of his ingenuity, he cannot be compelled to pay an increased tax.In addition to his judicial work, Tomlin served on a number of committees. He chaired the Royal Commission on Awards to Inventors between 1923 and 1933. He was also the chairman of the Child Adoption Committee, the University of London Commissioners, the Home Office advisory committee on the Cruelty to Animals Act, and the Royal Commission on the Civil Service.

Personal life 
He married Marion Olivia Waterfield in 1893; they had two daughters and three sons, the youngest of whom was the sculptor Stephen Tomlin.

Important judgments 
 Dashwood v Dashwood, [1927] WN 276, 64 LJNC 431, 71 Sol Jo 911
 Inland Revenue Commissioners v. Duke of Westminster [1936] AC 1

References

Tomlin 
Members of the Privy Council of the United Kingdom
1867 births
1935 deaths
Members of the Judicial Committee of the Privy Council
People educated at Harrow School
Alumni of New College, Oxford
English King's Counsel
20th-century King's Counsel
Members of the Inner Temple
Members of Lincoln's Inn
Chancery Division judges
Knights Bachelor
People from Canterbury
Life peers created by George V